Sule may refer to:

 Sule (river), a river of Lower Saxony, Germany
 Sule Skerry, a skerry in the North Atlantic off the north coast of Scotland
 Sule Stack, a stack in the North Atlantic off the north coast of Scotland
 Punta Sulè, a mountain of the Graian Alps in Italy
 Sule, a former name of Kashgar, an oasis city in western Xinjiang, China
 Sule Pagoda, a pagoda in Myanmar

People with the name
 Abdel Rahman Sule, South Sudanese politician
 Abdul Sule (born 1975), former Nigerian football player and current Player Agent
 Abdullahi Sule (born 1959), Nigerian entrepreneur, businessman and politician
 Anselmo Sule (1934–2002), Chilean politician, member of the Radical Party and afterwards of the Social Democrat Radical Party
 Baba Sule (born 1978), Ghanaian retired footballer
 Cole Shade Sule (born 1980), Cameroonian former swimmer
 Fuad Sule (born 1997), Irish-Nigerian professional footballer
 Gustav Sule (1910–1942), Estonian javelin thrower
 Harvey Alexander-Sule, English rapper and actor
 Niklas Süle (born 1995), German footballer
 Maitama Sule (1929–2017), Nigerian politician, diplomat, and statesman
 Olayinka Sule, Administrator of Jigawa State, Nigeria from 1991 to 1992
 Rofiat Sule, Nigerian footballer
 Sule Ahman, Military Administrator of Enugu State, Nigeria from 1996 to 1998
 Şule Gürbüz (born 1974), Turkish author, poet and clockmaker
 Şule Kut, head of the department of International Relations at the Istanbul Bilgi University
 Sule Ladipo (born 1974), former tennis player from Nigeria
 Sule Lamido (born 1948), Foreign minister of Nigeria from 1999 to 2003
 Şule Şahbaz (born 1978), Turkish weightlifter
 Şule Yüksel Şenler (1938-2019), Cypriot-born Turkish writer, journalist, and women's rights activist
 Sule Utura (born 1990), Ethiopian middle and long-distance runner
 Supriya Sule, Indian politician from the Nationalist Congress Party
 Zsolt Süle (born 1969), Hungarian singer-songwriter and part-time cook
 Sule (comedian) (born 1976), Indonesian comedian